Fabiola Ramos (born 15 September 1977 in Maracaibo) is a Venezuelan table tennis player who competed in her fifth consecutive Summer Olympics in 2012.

Career
Ramos won 4 gold medals at the 2002 Central American and Caribbean Games, in singles defeating Luisana Pérez, in doubles with Luisana Pérez, in team competition with María Ramos, María Mata and Luisana Pérez and in mixed doubles with Antonio Giannini.

Ramos won the bronze medal competing with Luisana Pérez at the 2003 Pan American Games doubles competition.

Playing in Valdivia, Chile she took the bronze medal in singles and mixed doubles with Antonio Giannini, also ranking 4th in the team competition of the 2004 Latin American Championship.

At the 2006 Central American and Caribbean Games held in Cartagena, Colombia, Ramos won the silver medal in women's doubles and the bronze in singles, team competition
 and mixed doubles.

Ramos win the gold medal in women's doubles at the 2010 Central American and Caribbean Games. She also won the silver in the team competition and the bronze in singles and mixed doubles.

She was selected as their flag-bearer for the 2012 Summer Olympics.

References 

1977 births
Living people
Venezuelan female table tennis players
Olympic table tennis players of Venezuela
Table tennis players at the 1996 Summer Olympics
Table tennis players at the 2000 Summer Olympics
Table tennis players at the 2004 Summer Olympics
Table tennis players at the 2008 Summer Olympics
Table tennis players at the 2012 Summer Olympics
Pan American Games bronze medalists for Venezuela
Pan American Games medalists in table tennis
Central American and Caribbean Games gold medalists for Venezuela
Central American and Caribbean Games silver medalists for Venezuela
Central American and Caribbean Games bronze medalists for Venezuela
Competitors at the 2002 Central American and Caribbean Games
Competitors at the 2006 Central American and Caribbean Games
Competitors at the 2010 Central American and Caribbean Games
South American Games gold medalists for Venezuela
South American Games silver medalists for Venezuela
South American Games bronze medalists for Venezuela
South American Games medalists in table tennis
Table tennis players at the 2003 Pan American Games
Table tennis players at the 2011 Pan American Games
Competitors at the 2006 South American Games
Central American and Caribbean Games medalists in table tennis
Medalists at the 2003 Pan American Games
Medalists at the 2011 Pan American Games
Sportspeople from Maracaibo
20th-century Venezuelan women
21st-century Venezuelan women